The 1984 ECAC Hockey Men's Ice Hockey Tournament was the 23rd tournament in league history. It was played between March 2 and March 10, 1984. Quarterfinal games were played at home team campus sites, while the 'final four' games were played at the Boston Garden in Boston, Massachusetts. By winning the tournament, Rensselaer received the ECAC's automatic bid to the 1984 NCAA Division I Men's Ice Hockey Tournament.

Format
The tournament featured three rounds of play. The three teams that were division champions automatically qualified for the tournament while the remaining five seeds were given to the teams with the highest winning percentage. The top four seeds were given out to the three division champions and the top qualifier and assorted based upon winning percentage. The remaining four seeds were assigned to the other qualifiers and assorted based upon winning percentage. In the quarterfinals the first seed and eighth seed, the second seed and seventh seed, the third seed and sixth seed and the fourth seed and fifth seed played a two-game series to determine the winner. In the two games no overtime was permitted and if the two teams remained tied after the two games then a 10-minute mini-game would be played where a sudden-death overtime was allowed if the scheduled time did not produce a victor. After the opening round every series becomes a single-elimination game. In the semifinals, the highest seed plays the lowest remaining seed while the two remaining teams play with the winners advancing to the championship game and the losers advancing to the third place game. The tournament champion receives an automatic bid to the 1984 NCAA Division I Men's Ice Hockey Tournament.

Conference standings
Note: GP = Games played; W = Wins; L = Losses; T = Ties; Pct. = Winning percentage; GF = Goals for; GA = Goals against

Bracket
Teams are reseeded after the first round

Note: * denotes overtime period(s)

Quarterfinals

(1) Rensselaer vs. (8) Colgate

(2) Boston College vs. (7) Providence

(3) Boston University vs. (6) New Hampshire

(4) Harvard vs. (5) Clarkson

Semifinals

(1) Rensselaer vs. (5) Clarkson

(2) Boston College vs. (3) Boston University

Third Place

(2) Boston College vs. (5) Clarkson

Championship

(1) Rensselaer vs. (3) Boston University

Tournament awards

All-Tournament Team
None

MOP
Adam Oates (Rensselaer)

References

External links
ECAC Hockey
1983–84 ECAC Hockey Standings
1983–84 NCAA Standings

ECAC Hockey Men's Ice Hockey Tournament
ECAC tournament